Roseaplagis mortenseni is a species of sea snail in the family Trochidae, the top snails. The shell grows to a length of 7 mm. This marine species occurs off New Zealand, the Antipodes Islands and the Bounty Islands.

References

 Odhner, N.H. (1924) Papers from Dr. Th. Mortensen's Pacific Expedition 1914–1916. XIX. New Zealand Mollusca. Videnskabelige Meddelelser fra Dansk Naturhistorisk Forening i Kjobenhavn, 77, 1–90, 2 pls.
 Dell, R. K. (1956). The archibenthal Mollusca of New Zealand. Dominion Museum Bulletin. 18: 1-235.
 Powell, A.W.B. 1979: New Zealand Mollusca: Marine, Land and Freshwater Shells. Collins, Auckland 500p (p. 56)
 Marshall, B.A. 1998: The New Zealand Recent species of Cantharidus Montfort, 1810 and Micrelenchus Finlay, 1926 (Mollusca: Gastropoda: Trochidae). Molluscan Research 19: 107-156 (p. 144)

mortenseni
Gastropods described in 1924